David Schwartz (July 7, 1916 – December 21, 1989) was a judge of the United States Court of Claims from 1968 to 1982.

Born in New York, New York, Schwartz received a Bachelor of Arts from New York University in 1936, and an LL.B. from Harvard Law School in 1939. He then entered private practice in New York City until 1941, when he began a series of government positions. He was an attorney in the U.S. Department of Justice, first for the Board of Immigration Appeals in 1941, and then for the Alien Enemy Control Unit in 1942. From 1942 to 1943, he was a law clerk to Stanley F. Reed of the United States Supreme Court.

He was the principal attorney of the Foreign Economic Administration from 1943 to 1944, and was then legal advisor to the Balkan and Greece missions of the United Nations Relief and Rehabilitation Administration from 1944 to 1945. He returned to the Department of Justice as a trial attorney in the Office of Alien Property from 1945 to 1957, and in the Antitrust Division from 1957 to 1958. He then served as general counsel of the Development and Resources Corporation from 1958 to 1959, and as a partner in the Manhattan law firm of Stroock & Stroock & Lavan from 1960 to 1968.

In 1968, Schwartz became a trial judge of the U.S. Court of Claims. On October 1, 1982, Schwartz was appointed by operation of the Federal Courts Improvement Act, 96 Stat. 27, to a new seat on the United States Court of Claims. He assumed senior status on October 8, 1982, serving in that capacity until his death in Washington, DC.

See also 
 List of law clerks of the Supreme Court of the United States (Seat 6)

References

External links 

1916 births
1989 deaths
Harvard Law School alumni
Judges of the United States Court of Federal Claims
New York University alumni
United States Article I federal judges appointed by Ronald Reagan
20th-century American judges
Law clerks of the Supreme Court of the United States